Tricliceras auriculatum is an annual herb native to Nampula Mozambique.

References 

Passifloraceae